Matthew A. Zirkle is a Rear admiral with the United States Navy.  He currently serves as chief of staff for U.S. Naval Forces Europe, U.S. Navy Forces Africa and U.S. SIXTH Fleet.

References

External links
 MATTHEW  A. ZIRKLE, navylog.navymemorial.org

Year of birth missing (living people)
Living people
People from Hinsdale, Illinois
University of California, San Diego alumni
Samuel Curtis Johnson Graduate School of Management alumni
United States Navy admirals
Military personnel from Illinois